South Western Line or South West Line may refer to:

Glasgow and South Western Railway, Scotland
Glasgow South Western Line, Scotland
South West Main Line, England
South Western railway line, Queensland, Australia
South Western Railway, Western Australia
South West Line, Chennai Suburban, India
South West railway line, Sydney, Australia
South West Trains, United Kingdom
West South Line, Chennai Suburban, India

See also
South Line (disambiguation)
West Line (disambiguation)